To-Night's the Night is a musical comedy composed by Paul Rubens, with lyrics by Percy Greenbank and Rubens, and a book adapted by Fred Thompson.  Two songs were composed by Jerome Kern.  The story is based on the farce Les Dominos roses by Alfred Hennequin and Alfred Delacour.

The musical was produced by George Grossmith, Jr. and Edward Laurillard and directed by Austen Hurgon. It opened at the Shubert Theatre in New York on December 24, 1914. It then was produced at the Gaiety Theatre in London, opening on April 18, 1915 and running for a very successful 460 performances. Grossmith starred in the piece with Leslie Henson. Grossmith told The New York Times that the musical was the first Gaiety Theatre Company production presented in New York before opening in London.

Roles and original cast

Montagu Lovitt-Lovitt – James Blakeley 
Henry (His Nephew) – Leslie Henson 
Pedro (A Tango Teacher) – Max Dearly 
Robin Carraway – Vernon Davidson 
Alphonse (Head Waiter at Covent Garden) – Robert Nainby 
Albert – Victor Gouriet 
Lord Ridgemount – Stanley Brightman
Policeman – Forest Smith 
The Hon. Dudley Mitten – George Grossmith, Jr. 
June – Haideè de Rance 
Beatrice Carraway (Robin's Wife) – Julia James 
Victoria (Her Maid) – Moya Mannering 
Daisy De Menthe (Of the Piccadilly Theatre) – Madge Saunders 
Angela Lovitt-Lovitt (Montagu's Wife) –  Gladys Homfrey 
Lady Pussy Preston, Lady Edith Taplow, Mimi Skeats, The Hon. Baby Vereker, Avice Carlton, Yvette La Plage (Guests at the Carraways) – Peggy Kurton, Barbara Dunbar, Judith Nelmes, Doris Stocker, Elsie Scott and Adrah Fair 
Attendants at Covent Garden – Dorothy Devere and Vera Davis 
Alice (Maid at Daisy's) – Cynthia Murray

Musical numbers

Act I – The Carraway's House at Maidenhead
No. 1 - Chorus – "Life is very jolly down at Maidenhead" 
No. 2 - Carraway & Chorus – "Hullo! little ladies, now you can't complain, here's your faithful Robin" 
No. 3 - Beatrice, Henry, & Montagu – "No one can afford to be too fussy, prim, and proper" 
No. 4 - June & Pedro – "You foreigners have romantic ways, when merely paying a call" 
No. 5 - Dudley & Chorus – "If by some delightful chance at a dinner or a dance some delicious girl you meet" 
No. 6 - Victoria, Henry, & Pedro – "You're looking very sweet, can't we arrange to meet somewhere by and by?" 
No. 7 - Montagu & Girls – "I never had such a rotten time in all my blessed life" 
No. 8 - June & Dudley – "Got the cutest little way, like to watch you all the day" 
No. 9 - Finale Act I – "Tonight's the night of the new revue which ev'ryone should see" 

Act II – Scene 1 – Foyer of the Boxes, Royal Opera House
No. 10 - Chorus – "Oh, the Mannequin, Mannequin, Mannequin, Mannequin Ball!" 
No. 11 - June & Chorus – "I know a man (he lived across the street) who once composed a real good" 
No. 12 - Victoria – "I'm rather fond of someone who's very fond of me" 
No. 13 - Pedro & Chorus – "I'm a very contented chap, bright and gay, tout à fait" 
No. 14 - Beatrice & Dudley – "Once there was one little pair of boots" 
No. 15 - Dudley, Carraway, Henry & Pedro – "Nowadays we're told not to be so lazy" 

Act I – Scene 2 – Covent Garden Market

Act II – Scene 3 – Daisy's Flat in Mount Street 
No. 16 - Waltz Song – June & Chorus – "It's long after twelve, time that the moon went home to bed" 
No. 17 - Dudley & Chorus – "Why people rave about wonderful nights is one thing I never could see"

Addenda:
No. 18 - Pedro – "If from your window you just take a peep, on a warm sunny day" 
No. 19 - Henry – "I once made Mama a promise I would never flirt again"

See also
The Pink Dominos (1877 play)
Der Opernball (1898 operetta)

References

External links
 
 Song list and links to Midi files, lyrics and cast list

Broadway musicals
1914 musicals
Musicals based on plays
Musicals by Fred Thompson (writer)